The 2012–13 Oklahoma Sooners basketball team represented the University of Oklahoma in the 2012–13 NCAA Division I men's basketball season. The Sooners were led by Lon Kruger in his second season. The team played its home games at the Lloyd Noble Center in Norman, Oklahoma as a member of the Big 12 Conference. They finished the season 20–12, 11–7 in Big 12 play to finish in a tie for fourth place. They lost in the quarterfinals of the Big 12 tournament to Iowa State. The received an at-large bid to the 2013 NCAA tournament, where they lost in the second round to San Diego State.

Preseason

Departures

Recruits

Transfers

Roster

Schedule

|-
! colspan=9 style="background:#FFFDD0; color:#960018;"| Exhibition

|-
! colspan=9 style="background:#960018; color:#FFFDD0;"| Non-conference Regular Season

|-
! colspan=9 style="background:#960018; color:#FFFDD0;"| Big 12 Regular Season

|-
! colspan=9 style="background:#FFFDD0; color:#960018;"| 2013 Big 12 men's basketball tournament

|-
! colspan=9 style="background:#960018; color:#FFFDD0;"| 2013 NCAA tournament

References

External links
Official Athletics Site of the Oklahoma Sooners - Men's Basketball

Oklahoma Sooners men's basketball seasons
Oklahoma
Oklahoma